was a former Japanese castle located in the city of Matsuyama, Ehime Prefecture, Japan.  During the Muromachi period, it was the stronghold of the Kōno clan, who ruled Iyo Province under the Muromachi shogunate. The ruins of the castle were area designated a National Historic Site.

Overview
Yuzuki Castle is located on a hill near the spa town of Dōgo Onsen. At the end of the Heian period, Kōno Michinobu supported Minamoto no Yoritomo against the Heike clan during the Genpei War and was awarded with a large territory in Iyo Province in Shikoku. In the Kamakura period, the clan sided with Emperor Go-Toba against the Kamakura shogunate in the Jōkyū War and was suppressed, but due to the efforts of Kōno Michiari during the Mongol invasions of Japan in 1274 and 1281, the clan was restored to their position as shugo of Iyo province. In the Muromachi period, the clan found their position to be increasingly in name only. As Iyo Province was divided by geography into several river valleys, local warlords resisted Kōno overlordship, and the clan was threatened by the aggressive stance of the Hosokawa clan who dominated neighboring Sanuki Province.

Yuzuki Castle was constructed with these threads in mind. It consists of a Motte-and-bailey design with a hill  and  two surrounding water moats. The hill was divided into several enclosures, protected by clay walls. The diameter of the castle was roughly 400 meters. 

During the Sengoku period, the Kōno were allied with the Murakami pirates, who dominated the Seto Inland Sea and by the Mōri clan of Aki Province; however, these alliances did not protect the clan when Chōsokabe Motochika of Tosa Province invaded from the south, the armies of Toyotomi Hideyoshi invaded from the east, and the Mōri reneged on their alliance and attacked from the north.Yuzuki Castle was surrendered to Toyotomi Hideyoshi without a fight in 1585 and the Kōno clan came to an end. Hideyoshi chose not to use Yzuku Castle, so its ruins remained relatively well-preserved into the modern era. Its ruins were  excavated in 1988, now form part of Dōgo Park. A samurai complex has been reconstructed and the area is popular for its hanami (flower viewing) in spring. 

Yuzuki Castle was listed as one of Japan's Top 100 Castles by the Japan Castle Foundation in 2006.

The castle is located a five minute walk from Matsuyama city tram Dōgo-Onsen Station.

See also
List of Historic Sites of Japan (Ehime)

References

External links

  Dogo Park Yuzuki-jō homepage
Matsuyama city home page

Castles in Ehime Prefecture
Ruined castles in Japan
Historic Sites of Japan
100 Fine Castles of Japan
Matsuyama, Ehime
Iyo Province